The Duchy of Gniewkowo was a district principality and a fiefdom within the Kingdom of Poland during the era of fragmentation that was formed in 1314 from part of the Duchy of Inowrocław. The country was located in the Kuyavia and consisted of Gniewkowo and Słońsk Lands. Its capital was Gniewkowo and other important settlements were Szarlej, Złotoria and Słońsk. It was ruled by Kazimierz III of Gniewkowo and later his son, Władysław the White, from the Piast dynasty. In 1332 the duchy was conquered by the State of the Teutonic Order and was reestablished in 1343. Between 1363 and 1364, the duchy was incorporated into the Kingdom of Poland. Duke of Gniewkowo, Władysław the White, had later briefly re-established the duchy in the rebellion fought between 1373 and 1374 and later between 1375 and 1377, and eventually given up his claims to the land in 1377.

History

Reign of Kazimierz III of Gniewkowo 

Duchy of Gniewkowo was formed in 1314 from part of the Duchy of Inowrocław. Its territories were given to Kazimierz III of Gniewkowo by his father, Ziemomysł of Kuyavia, Duke of Inowrocław, in his testament. The county was located in the Kuyavia and consisted of Gniewkowo and Słońsk Lands. Its capital was Gniewkowo and other important settlements were Szarlej, Złotoria and Słońsk.

In 1332, during Polish–Teutonic War, forces of the State of the Teutonic Order laid the siege to Gniewkowo. Kazimierz III, knowing that he wasn't able to protect the city from falling into Teutonic control, burned down the city and left to exile. During the war, the Teutonic Order got control over the entire area of Kuyavia. In 1343, according to the Treaty of Kalisz, territories of the duchy were returned to Polish control, and Kazimierz III was reestablished as its ruler. As Gniewkowo got burned down during the war, Szarlej become the seat of the duke, and therefore, de facto capital of the state.

Reign of Władysław the White 
Kazimierz III died between 1347 and 1350 and was succeeded by his son, Władysław the White. He kept positive relations with the State of the Teutonic Order and the king of Poland. In 1359, the duke married Elżbieta, daughter of Albert of Strzelce. With the marriage, he probably was given Inowrocław Land as his fiefdom from Casimir III the Great, the king of Poland, that before was part of the Duchy of Inowrocław. After the death of his wife between 1360 or 1361, the duke returned his fiefdom to the king. At the turn of 1363 and 1364, Władysław pawned the duchy to the king of Poland for the prize of 1000 florins. This decision probably was caused by the worsening relations with the king of Poland, who, during the border dispute between the duke and the Kuyavian judge Kiwała, ruled in favour of the latter.

The rebellion 
In 1370, following the death of Casimir III the Great, Władysław the White had attempted to gain a right to succession of the throne of Poland, with the support of the Kuyavian and Greater Poland nobility opposed to the coronation of the Louis I of Hungary as the king. Despite that, he remained unsuccessful. On 8 September 1373, he arrived at Gniezno in disguise, and between 9 and 10 September, he conquered the territories of Duchy of Gniewkowo, including towns of Gniewkowo and Inowrocław; reestablishing the state and beginning the rebellion. Due to the more numerous forces of Louis I supporters lead by Sędziwój Pałuka, the king's refusal to negotiate and lack of support in the rest of Kuyavia, by 1374 Władysław had retreated to Driesen, State of the Teutonic Order.

Władysław, supported by Ulrich von Osten and a few Burgundian military units of Philip the Bold, had invaded Kuyavia again in 1375. During the attack, Władysław's forces had gained control over the Gniewkowo as well as the castles in the villages of Złotoria and Raciążek. At this point, both sides of the conflict were better prepared than in 1373. One of the more important fights in the conflict was the battle of Gniewkowo, during which the royal side had a decisive victory. Later, Władysław's forces had retreated to the Złotoria Castle and became fortified, but faced a siege and were forced to capitulate. Following that, Władysław challenged Bartosz Wezenborg to a duel, which he lost and during which he got injured.

In March 1377, in the agreement signed in Brześć Kujawski, Władysław the White agreed to give up his claims to the throne of Poland and lands of the Duchy of Gniewkowo. In return, he was given 10 000 florins and the status of the Abbot Governator of Pannonhalma Archabbey.

List of rulers 
 Kazimierz III of Gniewkowo (1314–1332, 1343–1347/1350)
 Władysław the White (1347/1350–1363/1364, 1373–1374, 1375–1377)

Notes

References

Bibliography 
 Rodowód Piastów małopolskich i kujawskich by K. Jasiński. Poznań–Wrocław. 2001. ISBN 83-913563-5-3.
 Piastowie. Leksykon biograficzny by S. Szczur and K. Ożog. Kraków. 1999. ISBN 83-08-02829-2.
 Władysław Biały. Ostatni Książę Kujawski by Józef Śliwiński. Kraków. 2017. ISBN 978-83-7730-250-7.
 Jadwiga of Anjou and the Rise of East Central Europe by Oskar Halecki. Polish Institute of Arts and Sciences of America. 1991. ISBN 0-88033-206-9.
 Rodowód książąt pomorskich by E. Rymar. Szczecin. Pomeranian Library. 2005. ISBN 83-87879-50-9, OCLC 69296056.
 Ziemia Dobrzyńska: Zeszyty Historyczne Dobrzyńskiego Oddziału WTN, vol. 6 by Mirosław Krajewski. Rypin. Dobrzyński Oddział Włocławskiego Towarzystwa Naukowego. 1999. p. 35-36.

Former countries in Europe
Former monarchies of Europe
Duchies of Poland
Fiefdoms of Poland
Former unrecognized countries
History of Poland during the Piast dynasty
14th-century establishments in Poland
14th-century disestablishments in Poland
States and territories established in 1314
States and territories established in 1343
States and territories established in 1373
States and territories established in 1375
States and territories disestablished in 1332
States and territories disestablished in 1363
States and territories disestablished in 1364
States and territories disestablished in 1374
States and territories disestablished in 1377